US Post Office-Rockville Centre is a historic post office building located at Rockville Centre in the town of Hempstead, Nassau County, New York, United States. It was built in 1937 and designed by consulting architect William Dewey Foster (1890-1958) for the Office of the Supervising Architect.  It is a one-story building clad with brick and trimmed in limestone in the Colonial Revival style.  It features an Art Deco style grill above the main entrance doors.  The lobby features four irregularly shaped murals by Victor White painted in 1939 of various local historic scenes."

It was listed on the National Register of Historic Places in 1989.

References

Rockville Centre
Government buildings completed in 1937
Colonial Revival architecture in New York (state)
Rockville Centre, New York
National Register of Historic Places in Hempstead (town), New York